Estadio Pensativo is a football stadium in Antigua Guatemala, Guatemala. The venue is home to Liga Nacional club Antigua (Panzas Verdes), and has a maximum capacity of 10,000 people.

The stadium is also the home of women's first division club Santiago de los Caballeros, and in 2011 it hosted three matches of the 2011 CONCACAF U-17 Championship qualification between Panama, Honduras, and Guatemala.

In 2021, the stadium received an upgrade so it can host CONCACAF matches, as well as matches of the Guatemala national football team.

References

External links
 StadiumDB.com
 Fussballtempel.net

Pensativo
Buildings and structures in Antigua Guatemala